The Center for Retirement Research at Boston College (CRR) was established in 1998 as part of the Retirement Research Consortium (RRC). In 2018, the CRR received renewed support from the U.S. Social Security Administration under the Retirement and Disability Research Consortium (RDRC). The RDRC includes parallel centers at the National Bureau of Economic Research., the University of Michigan and the University of Wisconsin–Madison. The center is a non-profit research institute, affiliated with the Carroll School of Management at Boston College. All of the CRR's research and publications are available to the public on its website.

The center sponsors multiple research projects and disseminates the findings, trains new scholars, and provides access to data on retirement.

Dissemination and publications
The Center distributes its research findings to an audience of government, corporate and labor leaders, the media, and the general public through a variety of publications.
 Issues in Brief: – analyses of topical issues.
 Working Papers: – in-depth review of research issues.
 Special Projects: – initiatives that go beyond the scope of the center's standard research studies. The most recent special projects include: Public Plans Data website, the National Retirement Risk Index, The Social Security Claiming Guide, The Social Security Fix-It Book, a broad assessment of "Work Opportunities for Older Americans," and the Financial Security Project.

Education
The annual Steven H. Sandell grant program and Dissertation Fellowship program fund scholarships in the field of retirement and disability research. The programs are funded by the U.S. Social Security Administration to provide opportunities for scholars to pursue projects on retirement and disability issues.

Affiliated institutions
 The Brookings Institution
 Mathematica – Center for Studying Disability Policy
 Syracuse University
 Urban Institute

References

Boston College
Research institutes in Massachusetts
Retirement in the United States